New Sweden is a town in Aroostook County, Maine, United States. The population was 577 at the 2020 census.

History
Starting in 1870, a Swedish-immigrant colony was established by the State of Maine in Aroostook County.  The State of Maine had appointed William W. Thomas, Jr., who had served as American Consul in Sweden during the administration of President Abraham Lincoln, to be State Immigration Commissioner. On March 23, 1870 the Legislature passed an Act authorizing a Board of Immigration and Thomas was named Commissioner of Immigration. Thomas went to Sweden, recruited the first 51 immigrants, and led them into the township that became New Sweden. Early hardships were overcome and the colony prospered and grew into the neighboring townships of Westmanland (1879), Stockholm (1881) and the surrounding areas.
New Sweden has maintained many Swedish traditions since its founding, including the celebrations of St. Lucia Day and "Midsommar." Founders Day is also observed on July 23 every year. The Swedish language can sometimes still be heard in the older generation. The New Sweden Folk Dancers typically perform at many of the Swedish celebrations and Swedish foods are known to grace the tables.

New Sweden was the home of Einar Gustafson, who was the archetype of the child for whom the Jimmy Fund was named.

Geography

Demographics

2010 census
As of the census of 2010, there were 602 people, 255 households, and 182 families living in the town. The racial makeup of the town was 95.5% White, 0.3% African American, 1.7% Native American, 0.3% Asian, 0.2% from other races, and 2.0% from two or more races. Hispanic or Latino of any race were 0.8% of the population.

There were 255 households, of which 26.7% had children under the age of 18 living with them, 59.2% were married couples living together, 6.7% had a female householder with no husband present, 5.5% had a male householder with no wife present, and 28.6% were non-families. 25.5% of all households were made up of individuals, and 13.7% had someone living alone who was 65 years of age or older. The average household size was 2.36 and the average family size was 2.81.

The median age in the town was 48.3 years. 19.6% of residents were under the age of 18; 4.8% were between the ages of 18 and 24; 18.9% were from 25 to 44; 39.2% were from 45 to 64; and 17.4% were 65 years of age or older. The gender makeup of the town was 50.5% male and 49.5% female.

2000 census

As of the census of 2000, there were 621 people, 247 households, and 179 families living in the town.  The population density was 17.9 people per square mile (6.9/km).  There were 319 housing units at an average density of 9.2 per square mile (3.5/km).  The racial makeup of the town was 95.17% White, 0.16% African American, 1.29% Native American, 0.48% Asian, 0.16% from other races, and 2.74% from two or more races. Hispanic or Latino of any race were 2.25% of the population. 33.4% were of Swedish, 16.9% French, 14.5% English, 9.6% Irish and 6.0% German ancestry according to Census 2000.

There were 247 households, out of which 29.1% had children under the age of 18 living with them, 60.3% were married couples living together, 6.1% had a female householder with no husband present, and 27.5% were non-families. 22.7% of all households were made up of individuals, and 10.9% had someone living alone who was 65 years of age or older.  The average household size was 2.51 and the average family size was 2.94.

In the town, the population was spread out, with 22.5% under the age of 18, 5.2% from 18 to 24, 26.2% from 25 to 44, 31.1% from 45 to 64, and 15.0% who were 65 years of age or older.  The median age was 44 years. For every 100 females, there were 102.3 males.  For every 100 females age 18 and over, there were 93.2 males.

The median income for a household in the town was $29,625, and the median income for a family was $42,563. Males had a median income of $30,625 versus $22,500 for females. The per capita income for the town was $14,534.  About 10.4% of families and 14.4% of the population were below the poverty line, including 24.4% of those under age 18 and 11.8% of those age 65 or over.

Historic buildings and sites

Sites and buildings located in New Sweden which are eligible for the National Register of Historic Places include the Gustaf Adolph Lutheran Church was organized August 1871.
Gustaf Adolph Lutheran Church [along with Faith, Caribou and Trinity (formerly Oscar Frederick) Lutheran churches]was served by a native Swedish pastor as recently as 1979–1985 when The Rev. Hans Olof Andræ accepted a call to the three-point parish. Pastor Andræ occasionally conducted services in Swedish and his daughter, Rebecka Vanja Andræ, taught conversational Swedish classes 1983–1985.

2003 poisoning
The town made national news headlines in 2003 when a man poisoned the coffee urn at the local Lutheran church, sickening 15 parishioners and killing one. On April 27, 2003, 78-year-old Walter Reid Morrill, known to the town by his middle name, died of arsenic poisoning after drinking coffee at the Gustaf Adolph Lutheran Church in New Sweden, and 15 other, mostly elderly churchgoers became ill, three of them seriously.  Five days later, church member Daniel Bondeson, 53, was found after apparently shooting himself in the lower-chest with a rifle, and supposedly leaving a suicide note in which he confessed to having something to do with the poisoning, but the note has never been released to the public.

The crime was chronicled in Christine Young's 2005 true crime book A Bitter Brew: Faith, Power, and Poison in a Small New England Town and on the show, Mystery ER, which aired an episode on this incident from the point of view of the youngest victim, then 30 years old.

References

Other sources

The Story of New Sweden as Told at the Quarter Centennial Celebration (University of Michigan Library. 1896)
Lenentine, Charlotte  The Swedish People of Northern Maine (University of Maine. 1950)
Hede, Richard   Maine's Swedish Colony 1870–1970 Centennial Book (1970)
 Young, Christine Ellen. A Bitter Brew: Faith, Power, and Poison in a Small New England Town. Berkley Pub Group, 2006. , 9780425209189.

External links
Town of New Sweden
Maine's Swedish Colony

Swedish-American culture in Maine
Swedish-American history
Towns in Aroostook County, Maine
Towns in Maine
1870 establishments in Maine
Populated places established in 1870
Settlement schemes in the United States